Dickinsia is a monotypic genus of flowering plants belonging to the family Apiaceae. The only known species is  Dickinsia hydrocotyloides.

Its native range is Central China.

The genus is named after Frederick Dickins (1838–1915), British scholar and amateur botanist. It was first published and described by Adrien René Franchet in Nouv. Arch. Mus. Hist. Nat., séries 2, Vol.8 on page 244 in 1885 (publ. 1886).

References

Azorelloideae
Monotypic Apiaceae genera
Flora of China
Plants described in 1885